Lubbock is a small lunar impact crater on the western edge of Mare Fecunditatis. It was named after British astronomer John Lubbock. It is located to the north of the crater Gutenberg and south of Secchi. Lubbock is circular, with a low rim and flat interior. There is a small break in the eastern wall.

On the mare to the south of the patch of highland containing Lubbock is the rille system designated Rimae Goclenius. The parallel rays from the crater pair of Messier and Messier A reaches the rim of Lubbock H to the north.

Satellite craters
By convention these features are identified on lunar maps by placing the letter on the side of the crater midpoint that is closest to Lubbock.

References

 
 
 
 
 
 
 
 
 
 
 

Impact craters on the Moon